Frank Randolph Cady (September 8, 1915 – June 8, 2012) was an American actor best known for his role as storekeeper Sam Drucker in three American television series during the 1960s – Petticoat Junction, Green Acres, and The Beverly Hillbillies – and his earlier role as Doc Williams on The Adventures of Ozzie and Harriet.

Early life 
Cady was born in Susanville, California, the youngest of three children of Leon and Clara Cady. In high school, he worked at a local newspaper, The Lassen County Advocate. Cady's family later moved to Wilsonville, Oregon.

He studied journalism and drama at Stanford University, where he was involved with the campus humor magazine, the Stanford Chaparral. Following college graduation, Cady served an apprenticeship at the Westminster Theater in London, appearing in four plays. In England, he made an early television appearance on the BBC in late 1938.

He returned to Stanford in 1939 for graduate studies and a position as a teaching assistant. While at Stanford, Cady met and later married his wife, Shirley Katherine Jones, in 1940. Born in Oakland, California, Shirley Cady, a Stanford graduate, had several vocations – professional singer, teacher, and legal secretary.

Dissatisfied with academia, Frank began a series of jobs two years later, as an announcer and news broadcaster at various California radio stations. His career was put on hold in 1943 when he joined the United States Army Air Forces, serving in England, France, and Germany during World War II.

Television and movie career 
After being discharged from military service in 1946, Cady appeared in a series of plays in the Los Angeles area that led to movie roles, beginning in 1947. In 1949, he had an uncredited speaking role in the film noir drama D.O.A.. In 1950, he had another uncredited role in Father of the Bride. He had a small part in The Asphalt Jungle (also 1950) playing a witness who refused to identify a robbery suspect. He appeared in George Pal's film When Worlds Collide (1951), and worked with Pal again in 1964 in 7 Faces of Dr. Lao.

Cady acted in Billy Wilder's Ace in the Hole (or The Big Carnival, also 1951) and portrayed the male half of the fire escape sleeping couple in Rear Window in 1954. He played the husband of Eileen Heckart characters in two films: The Bad Seed (1956) and Zandy's Bride (1974). He appeared on the Make Room For Daddy episode that was the pilot for The Andy Griffith Show. He was cast on some radio programs, including Gunsmoke episode #140 ("Outlaw Robin Hood") on January 8, 1955.

In the 1950s, Cady played Doc Williams in Ozzie and Harriet (1953–1964). In 1961, he made a guest appearance on Perry Mason as twin brothers Joe and Hiram Widlock in "The Case of the Pathetic Patient". 

In 1964, he played Webb Norton, an angry and abusive father (to Dylan Cannon’s character Ivy Norton) on Gunsmoke, in the episode  “Aunt Thede” (S10E13).

He acted in television and was the only actor to play a recurring character on three television sitcoms at the same time, which he did from 1968 to 1969, appearing on The Beverly Hillbillies, Green Acres, and Petticoat Junction simultaneously. As Sam Drucker, he appeared in 142 of 170 Green Acres episodes during its six-year run from 1965 to 1971. Also as Drucker, he was one of only three co-stars of Petticoat Junction who stayed with the series for its entire seven-year run (1963–1970), along with Edgar Buchanan and Linda Henning, appearing in 152 of the show's 222 episodes. He played Drucker in 10 episodes of The Beverly Hillbillies ifrom 1968 to 1970, and he continued his Drucker role in the final season of Green Acres after Petticoat Junction ended in 1970.

His final acting role was in the television movie Return to Green Acres (1990). In a 1995 interview with the Portland Oregonian Cady spoke of his television career: "You get typecast. I'm remembered for those shows and not for some pretty good acting jobs I did other times. I suppose I ought to be grateful for that, because otherwise I wouldn't be remembered at all. I've got to be one of the luckiest guys in the world."

In 2005, Cady attended Eddie Albert's funeral, along with Green Acres co-stars Sid Melton and Mary Grace Canfield.

Later life 
 
Cady loved to write humorous poems, limericks, and parodies of songs. He also loved playing golf with friends, as well as traveling; he enjoyed many years of hiking in Switzerland. In 1977,  he and his wife moved to Cambria, California. In 1991, they moved again, to his former hometown, Wilsonville, Oregon.

Death 
Shirley Cady died on August 22, 2008, at the age of 91. The Cadys, who were married 68 years, had two children – daughter Catherine Turk and son Steven Cady. They had three grandchildren and three great-grandchildren. Frank Cady died at his home on June 8, 2012 at age 96. No specific cause was given. Upon his death he was cremated and his ashes are buried at Los Osos Valley Memorial Park, Los Osos, California in the same plot as his wife.

Filmography

Television credits

References

External links 

 
 

1915 births
2012 deaths
Male actors from California
American male film actors
United States Army Air Forces personnel of World War II
American male television actors
People from Susanville, California
People from Wilsonville, Oregon
Stanford University alumni
United States Army Air Forces soldiers